Azad-e Sofla (also Romanized as Āzād-e Soflā and Āzād Soflá; also known as Azadbar and Āzād-e Pā’īn) is a village in Mojezat Rural District, in the Central District of Zanjan County, Zanjan Province, Iran. At the 2006 census, its population was 1,066, in 246 families.

References 

Populated places in Zanjan County